"Ti rincontrerò" is a single by the Italian singer Marco Carta.
It was the first single to be released, in 2008, from the album Ti rincontrerò.

Chart performance

External links
 Official website

References

2008 singles
2008 songs
Song articles with missing songwriters